Element 21 is a golf and fishing equipment manufacturing company based in Toronto, Ontario, Canada. The company made headlines in 2006 when they paid the Russian Federal Space Agency to send a golf ball into space.

The company takes its name from scandium, the 21st element of the periodic table, alloys of which are used to make golf clubs and fishing rods. Element 21 claims that their use of scandium improves performance compared with that of other commonly used metals.

References

External links
Official website

Golf equipment manufacturers
Manufacturing companies based in Toronto